The Women's 10 kilometre cross-country skiing event was part of the cross-country skiing programme at the 1968 Winter Olympics, in Grenoble, France. It was the fifth appearance of the event. The competition was held on 9 February 1968, at Autrans.

Results

References

Women's cross-country skiing at the 1968 Winter Olympics
Women's 10 kilometre cross-country skiing at the Winter Olympics
Oly
Cross